The White Heather is an 1897 melodrama by playwrights Cecil Raleigh and Henry Hamilton.  The climactic scene of the play portrays a fight between two underwater divers.

Background

The play debuted at Drury Lane on 16 September 1897, the first produced by new managing director Arthur Collins.  Typical of Drury Lane shows of the period, the elaborate production ran for four hours, and included scenes set at the Stock Exchange, Battersea Park, Boulter's Lock, and the Devonshire House Ball of 1897.  It had an initial run of 91 performances until 15 December 1897 and returned for 43 more performances from 12 May to 25 June 1898.  The Princess's Theatre revived the play in 1899 with Eily Malyon in the cast for 31 performances.

Upon its debut in London, Charles Frohman's London representative William Lestocq immediately acquired the American rights.  The play had a successful 184-performance New York run at the Academy of Music from 22 November 1897 to 30 April 1898.

It was adapted into a silent film of the same name in 1919.

Original London cast
The primary cast included Mrs. John Wood, Henry Neville, Beatrice Lamb, Patti Browne, Kate Rorke, Dawson Milward, and Robert Loraine.

Lord Angus Cameron by Henry Neville
Edgar Trefusis by Herman de Lange
Captain Alec MacLintock by Dawson Milward
Dick Beach by Robert Loraine
James Hume by J.B. Gordon
Captain Dewar Gay by C.M. Lowne
Horace Saxonby by Ernest Lawford
Jack Sadler by Albert Mayer
Duke of Shetland by Rosier
Jackson by Howard Russell
Dr. Blake by Akerman May
Mr. Craven by Edwin Palmer
Hudson by Edward Shrimpton
Turner by Frank Damer
Max Leclare by Alfred Balfour
William Smart by R.A. Lyons
Lady Janet MacLintock by Mrs. John Wood
Marion Hume by Kate Rorke
Lady Molly Fanshaw by Pattie Browne
Lady Hermione de Vaux by Beatrice Lamb
Hon. Blanche Rossiter by Lillian Menelly
Donald by Valli Valli
Lady Lumley by Mary Brough
Mrs. Andrews by Mrs. E. Palmer

Original New York cast

Lady Janet Maclintock by Rose Coghlan
Marion Hume by Amelia Bingham
Lady Mollie Fanshawe by Olive May
Lady Hermonie de Vaux by Madeline Bouton
Mrs. Andrew by Annie Adams
Lord Angus Cameron by Francis Carlyle
Edgar Trefusis by Robert Cotton
Captain Alec Maclintock by Miller Kent
Dick Beach by Richard Bennett
James Hume by Harry Harwood
Captain Dewar Gay by Lewis Baker
The Duke of Shetland by Frank Burbeck
Dr. Blake by Robert Jenkins
Mr. Craven by Douglas Lloyd
Hudson by E.Y. BackusAustin, Henry (8 January 1898). "The White Heather" (review), The Illustrated American, pp. 63-64

References

External links

 
 Photographs from 1897 London production at Victoria and Albert Museum (search "White Heather" for many photographs)

1897 plays
Melodramas
Plays set in London